Darren Dixon (born 19 January 1980), known professionally as D Double E, is a British grime MC, DJ and record producer from Forest Gate, East London. He performs both as a solo artist and as a member of the grime duo Newham Generals.

Career
D Double E has been active for over 20 years, beginning his career in jungle and UK garage music. In the mid-1990s, he was a DJ and went by the name DJ Dan. D Double was at the time in a crew called Bass Inject, alongside Terror Danjah and DJ Tempo. In 1998, Terror and D Double E went on to form the drum and bass collective the Reckless Crew which played sets on Rinse FM. RWD, He was a member of the early grime collective N.A.S.T.Y Crew, until leaving after a dispute in December 2003. He then founded the group Newham Generals together with Monkstar and Footsie. The group remains active as a duo consisting of D Double E and Footsie. He and the Newham Generals signed to Dizzee Rascal's Dirtee Stank label.

As a solo artist, D Double E's releases include "Street Fighter Riddim", "Bluku, Bluku", "Bad 2 tha Bone", "Lovely Jubbly", and "Wolly". He is known for using vocalisations such as "bud-a-bup-bup" and "it's mree, mree". Fellow MC Skepta once named him as the "greatest of all time", and Dizzee Rascal said he was one of the artists who inspired him to start MCing.

IKEA invited D Double E to create a special soundtrack for a Christmas 2019 campaign, marking the first time the grime music genre was used in seasonal advertising.

Personal life
D Double E is of Jamaican descent.

Discography

Studio albums

Charted singles

References

External links

1980 births
Living people
Black British male rappers
English rappers
English DJs
English record producers
Grime music artists
People from Forest Gate
Place of birth missing (living people)
Rappers from London
English people of Jamaican descent
Electronic dance music DJs